The Road Movie Trilogy (also known as The Road Trilogy) is a series of three road movies directed by German film director Wim Wenders in the mid-1970s: Alice in the Cities (1974), The Wrong Move (1975), and Kings of the Road (1976). All three films were shot by cinematographer Robby Müller and mostly take place in West Germany. The centerpiece of the trilogy, The Wrong Move, was shot in colour whereas Alice in the Cities was in black and white 16 mm, and Kings of the Road was in black and white 35 mm film.

Conception
Director Wim Wenders didn't conceive of the three films as a trilogy, and they were first labelled as one by U.S. critic Richard Roud. However, U.S. filmmaker Michael Almereyda writes that "they are unified by shared themes, an exacting formal rigor, and the presence of Rüdiger Vogler". Almereyda remarks that Wenders' earliest feature films, Summer in the City and The Goalkeeper's Fear of the Penalty, also involved "aimless journeys", but the Road Movie trilogy was distinct as "travel not only propels the story but also absorbs and reshapes it". The films were also made on small budgets but with great mobility.

Legacy 
The three low-budget films established Wenders' and Müller's road movie style, a style that they later resurrected in bigger budget color films including Paris Texas and Until the End of the World. The trilogy also introduced (in Alice in the Cities) the fictitious wandering character Philip Winter who returns in three later Wenders films, Lisbon Story, Until the End of the World, and Faraway, So Close!. The style of aimless wandering in the Road Movie trilogy influenced other directors including American director Jim Jarmusch (Stranger Than Paradise) who worked with Wenders on The State of Things. The Road Movie trilogy established Wenders' prominence in international cinema and has attained minor cult film status among Wenders and Müller fans.

A number of issues, such as rights issues concerning the soundtracks of the films, have made the three Road Movie films hard to find on video in the United States. However, in 2016 The Criterion Collection released the films on DVD and Blu-ray as Wim Wenders: The Road Trilogy.

References

German film series
West German films
1970s German-language films
1970s drama road movies
German drama road movies
German black-and-white films
Films directed by Wim Wenders
Trilogies
1970s German films